The M133 is a turbocharged inline-four engine produced by Mercedes-Benz. Since its debut in 2013, it has been awarded International Engine of the Year three times in the "Best New Engine" and "1.8-litre to 2-litre" categories.

Design 
The M133 is based on the M270 engine but has been extensively revised by AMG. It features a twin-scroll turbocharger, BlueDIRECT direct injection, iron-carbon alloy on the cylinder walls to reduce friction, and zircon in the cylinder heads to increase thermal conductivity. The cooling system is also based on the one found in the Mercedes-Benz SLS AMG.

Models

M133 DE20 LA (265 kW version) 
 2013–2015 C117 CLA45 AMG
 2013–2015 W176 A45 AMG
 2014–2015 X156 GLA45 AMG

M133 DE20 LA (280 kW version) 
 2015–2018 C117 CLA45 AMG
 2015–2018 W176 A45 AMG
 2015–2019 X156 GLA45 AMG

References 

Mercedes-Benz engines
Straight-four engines
Gasoline engines by model